Never Regret is the second studio album by American country music artist Craig Campbell. It was released on May 7, 2013 via Bigger Picture Music Group. "Outta My Head" was released as the first single. "Keep Them Kisses Comin'" was released as the second single.

Track listing

Personnel
 Craig Campbell - lead vocals
 Preslee Campbell - vocals on "When She Grows Up"
 J.T. Corenflos - electric guitar
 Dan Dugmore - steel guitar, lap steel guitar
 Stuart Duncan - fiddle
 Tommy Harden - drums, percussion
 Joel Key - banjo
 Andy Leftwich - fiddle, mandolin
 Brent Mason - acoustic guitar, electric guitar
 John Mock - harmonium
 Billy Panda - acoustic guitar
 Gary Prim - Hammond B-3 organ, piano
 Matt Rovey - background vocals
 John Wesley Ryles - background vocals
 Jimmie Lee Sloas-  bass guitar
 Scott Vestal - banjo

Chart performance

Album

Singles

References

2013 albums
Craig Campbell (singer) albums
Bigger Picture Music Group albums
Albums produced by Keith Stegall